Alice Balducci (born 11 September 1986) is an Italian former tennis player.

Balducci won eight singles and 22 doubles titles on the ITF Circuit. On 26 May 2014, she reached her best singles ranking of world No. 361. On 20 August 2012, she peaked at No. 290 in the WTA doubles rankings.

Partnering Katarzyna Kawa, Balducci won her first $50k tournament at the 2013 Trofeul Popeci, defeating Diana Buzean and Christina Shakovets in the final.

ITF Circuit finals

Singles: 17 (8 titles, 9 runner-ups)

Doubles: 42 (22 titles, 20 runner-ups)

References
 
 

1986 births
Living people
Italian female tennis players
21st-century Italian women